Saundra Brown Armstrong (born March 23, 1947) is a senior United States district judge of the United States District Court for the Northern District of California.

Education and career

Born in Oakland, California, Armstrong received an Associate of Arts degree from Merritt College in 1967 and a Bachelor of Arts degree from California State University, Fresno in 1969. She was the first female black police officer in the Oakland Police Department where she served from 1970 to 1977. She then received a Juris Doctor from the University of San Francisco School of Law in 1977. She was a judicial extern, California Court of Appeals in 1977, and was a deputy district attorney in Alameda County, California from 1978 to 1979 and from 1980 to 1982. From 1979 to 1980, she was a senior consultant to the California Assembly Committee on Criminal Justice. She was a trial attorney of Public Integrity Section of the United States Department of Justice from 1982 to 1983, and then served as a Commissioner on the Consumer Product Safety Commission from 1983 to 1986, and on the United States Parole Commission from 1986 to 1989. She was a Judge on the Alameda Superior Court, California from 1989 to 1991.

Federal judicial service

On April 25, 1991, Armstrong was nominated by President George H. W. Bush to a seat on the United States District Court for the Northern District of California vacated by William Austin Ingram. She was confirmed by the United States Senate on June 14, 1991, and received her commission on June 18, 1991. She earned a Master of Divinity (M.Div.) from the Pacific School of Religion in 2012 and she assumed senior status on March 23, 2012.

See also 
 List of African-American federal judges
 List of African-American jurists
 List of first women lawyers and judges in California

References

Sources
 

1947 births
Living people
African-American judges
California state court judges
California State University, Fresno alumni
Judges of the United States District Court for the Northern District of California
Merritt College alumni
Superior court judges in the United States
United States district court judges appointed by George H. W. Bush
20th-century American judges
University of San Francisco alumni
21st-century American judges
20th-century American women judges
21st-century American women judges